The S2C reactor is a naval reactor used by the United States Navy to provide electricity generation and propulsion on warships.  The S2C designation stands for:

 S = Submarine platform
 2 = Second generation core designed by the contractor
 C = Combustion Engineering was the contracted designer

This nuclear reactor is the shipboard equivalent of the S1C reactor, and was installed on the experimental USS Tullibee (SSN-597) submarine.

References

United States naval reactors